The Bravery Council of Australia Meeting 70 Honours List was announced by the Governor General of Australia on 2 March 2009.

Awards were announced for 
the Star of Courage,
the Bravery Medal,
Commendation for Brave Conduct and
Group Bravery Citation.

† indicates an award made posthumously.

Star of Courage

Stephen William Hyland, Queensland
Michael Anthony Tucker, Victoria

Bravery Medal (BM)

Editha Aquino, Victoria
Michael John Chillemi, New South Wales
Phillip John Collins, New South Wales
Paul Johannes de Waard, Middelburg, Netherlands
Senior Sergeant Richard James Downie, Queensland Police
Brian Leonard Elvery, New South Wales
Grant James Ford, Victoria
Stephen Oswald Foster, Queensland
Daniel Garlick, Victoria
Benar Giawa, Indonesia
Sergeant Peter Thomas Gibson, New South Wales Police
Alan James Grant, New South Wales
Adiziduhu Harefa, Indonesia
Motani Harefa, Indonesia
Brendan Gerard Keilar†, Victoria
Senior Constable John Sione Lima, Queensland Police
Luke Luchetti, New South Wales
Craig Meaney, New South Wales
Barbara Joan Mitchell, Western Australia
Seti Eli Ndruru, Indonesia
Simon Nguyen, New South Wales
Senior Constable Anthony Charles Rodgers, New South Wales Police
Edward George Tamms, Western Australia
Rodney Newman Wells, Western Australia
Trent James West, Western Australia

Commendation for Brave Conduct

Glendon Leigh Aitchison, Queensland
Sergeant Gary Charles Beling, Queensland Police
Stephen Charles Bennett, New South Wales
Selwyn John Brown, New South Wales
Anthony Joseph Cameron, New South Wales
Helen June Cowan, Western Australia
Stephen James Coward, Western Australia
Chief Petty Officer Gary Roderick Dhu, Queensland
Senior Constable Paul James Doherty, Queensland Police
Peter Henry Dubois, New South Wales
Brent Craig Eccles, Western Australia
Samuel William Edwards, Queensland
Paul Anthony Fitzgerald, Australian Capital Territory
Jane Cristy Flavel, South Australia
Mark David Flett, Australian Capital Territory
Charlie Ricky Gafa, Victoria
Matthew Peter Hobson, New South Wales
Siobhan Jackson, Victoria
Charles Lakey, Victoria
Judith Rae McAlpine, Western Australia
Senior Constable Daniel James McArthur, New South Wales Police
Constable Ray Peter Noffke, New South Wales Police
Gary Edward Pearce, New South Wales
Jeffrey Piefke, Western Australia
Constable Benjamin Geoffrey Radcliffe, New South Wales Police
Duncan James Rayward, New South Wales
Chief Inspector David Kenneth Robinson, New South Wales Police
Michael Donald Rogan, New South Wales
Senior Sergeant Garry John Smith, Northern Territory Police
Senior Constable John Robert Smith, New South Wales Police
Michael Thomas Sydes, New South Wales
Sarah Leone Thompson, New South Wales
Mark William Tucker, New South Wales
Catherine Odette Vincent, Queensland
Keslie Rose Zosars, New South Wales

Group Bravery Citation
Awardees comprise the crew of the Tugboat Watagan who, on 8 June 2007, went to the assistance of the Sea Confidence during the Hunter/Central Coast Storm Emergency.
Stephen Robert Balker
Captain Jack De Gilio
Paul Stephen Devereux
Leslie Harold Handicott
Robert William Harris
Steven William Parker
Jon Gregory Partridge
George William Sewell
Stephen Ernest Taylor

Awardees comprise the crew of the Tugboat Wickham who, on 8 June 2007, went to the assistance of the Betis during the Hunter/Central Coast Storm Emergency.
Murray Francis Green
Ashley Ian Hardy
Captain Aaron Jeremiah Henshaw
Gerard Christopher Inkston
Michael Arthur Miners
Captain Ian Robert Turnton
Peter James Weary
Thomas Pearson Wiley

References

Orders, decorations, and medals of Australia
2008 awards
2008 in Australia